Apinan Poshyananda was born in Bangkok, Thailand in 1956.  He is one of the most renowned curators and art writers in the Asian region.

Biography

Education
Poshyananda received an MFA degree from the University of Edinburgh, and a PhD in art history from Cornell University.

Career
Poshyananda is now Permanent Secretary for the Ministry of Culture, Thailand. Before joining the Ministry of Culture, he acted as the chief curator of the Art Center of Academic Resources, Chulalongkorn University.

Contribution to contemporary art
Poshyananda eagerly promotes Thai contemporary artists by sending them overseas to participate in such major international art exhibitions. With his expertise in art and culture, as well as his great contribution to the art world, he then became an internationally recognized curator.

In 2001, Poshyananda was awarded the Outstanding National Research Award by the National Research Council of Thailand.

Selected works
 Traditions/Tensions (New York, U.S.A., traveling, 1996)
 1st and 2nd Asia Pacific Triennial (Brisbane, Australia, 1993, 1996), Thai and Australian section, respectively
 Appointed as a commissioner for the Asian section of 24th São Paulo Biennale (Brazil, 1998)
 9th Sydney Biennale (1992)
 4th Istanbul Biennale (1994)
 1st Johannesburg Biennale (1995)
 1st Liverpool Biennale (1999)
 Curating solo exhibitions by Nobuyoshi Araki, Yasurmasa Morimura, Choi Jeong Hwa, Zhang Peili, Hung Liu, Marina Abramović and Mella Jaarsma
 Organizing numerous exhibitions including one-person shows by Pinaree Sanpitak, Chatchai Puipia, Kamol Phaosavasdi, Vasan Sitthiket, Jakapan Vilasaneekul, Pratuang Emjaroen, Manit Sriwanichpoom and Araya Rasdjarmrearnsook.
 Organizing a solo show by Montien Boonma in New York
 Joining the exhibition Beyond Paradise of the Moderna Museet in StockholmGuest as a guest curator.
 Selecting contemporary Nordic art to travel to Asia in 2002
 International advisor for 1st Echigo-Tsumari Triennal (2000), 1st Yokohama Triennal (2001), and the art acquisition committee of The Asia Society, New York.
 Author of Modern Art in Thailand (OUP, 1992) and Western-style Painting and Sculpture in the Thai Royal Court (Bangkok, 1993)
 One of the curators writing for Fresh Cream (Phaidon, 2000)
 Co-author of a major text book on modern and contemporary Asian art, published in New York
 Co-editor of Over Here (The New Museum of Contemporary Art, New York)
Curator of first edition of Bangkok Biennale (2018)

His role of leading the Bangkok Art Biennale:

As chief executive and artistic director of Bangkok Art Biennale, Prof. Apinan Poshyananda led the inaugural edition of The Bangkok Art Biennale 2018 (BAB 2018). The first biennale in Bangkok was delighted to announce its 75 participating artists from 33 countries explored the theme ‘Beyond Bliss’ at a press conference in Hong Kong on March 26, 2018.
Dr. Prof. Apinan, along with other curators of the committee members, which comprised Guggenheim senior curator Alexandra Munroe; independent curator David Elliott; director of the National Gallery Singapore Eugene Tan; Mori Art Museum director Fumio Nanjo; Artsonje and Gwangju Biennale director Sunjung Kim; Saatchi gallery CEO Nigel Hurst; and Buenos Aires-born artist Rirkrit Tiravanija.

The list of the artists comprises well-known Thai artists Sakarin Krue-on and Chumpon Apisuk; famous figures from the Asia region, including Yoshitomo Nara, Ho Tzu Nyen, Heri Dono and Choi Jeong Hwa; as well as big names from Europe, such as performance artist Marina Abramović, and the artist duo Michael Elmgreen and Ingar Dragset.
Other notable and important artists are AES+F,  Firoz Mahmud, Gauri Gill,  Huang Yong Ping, Yayoi Kusama, Jean-Michel Basquiat, Montien Boonma, Lee Bul, Sherman Ong, Wisut Ponnimit, Angki Purbandono, Natee Utarit, Yan Pei Ming, Shigeyuki Kihara and Others.

References

Apinan Poshyananda
Cornell University alumni
Alumni of the University of Edinburgh
1956 births
Living people
Apinan Poshyananda
Apinan Poshyananda